Jed Weaver (born August 11, 1976) is a former National Football League (NFL) tight end. He grew up in Redmond, Oregon, becoming an all-league and all-state player in football, basketball and baseball.

High school
At Redmond High School in Redmond, Oregon, Weaver was a two-sport standout in football, and baseball.  In football, he won all-league and all-state honors, while in baseball, as a senior pitcher, he won third-team all-state honors. Jed played in the Oregon All-State games in both baseball and football before going to the University of Oregon.

College career
Weaver played college football at the University of Oregon after walking on as a freshman, he was then drafted in the seventh round of the 1999 NFL Draft. He is a cousin of Los Angeles Angels of Anaheim pitcher Jered Weaver and Los Angeles Dodger pitcher Jeff Weaver and his brother Dan Weaver was a 37-game starter at Center for the University of Oregon football program from 2000-2003.

Professional career
Weaver was a member of the New England Patriots on the Super Bowl XXXIX Championship team in 2004. Jed was drafted by the Philadelphia Eagles and made the All Rookie team after starting 11 games in 1999, played 3 seasons with the Miami Dolphins from 2000-2002, helping the Dolphins to the playoffs in two seasons and in 2002 was a major factor blocking for the rushing title winner that year, Ricky Williams. He moved to the San Francisco 49ers having his best season in 2003 by starting all 16 games and catching 35 passes for 437 yards. His career totals are 96 games played, 88 catches for 1090 yards and 6 touchdowns in 6 seasons.

Personal life
Jed and his wife Jori currently live in South Florida. He works in real estate, while she owns a women's clothing boutique in Pembroke Pines.

References

1976 births
Living people
Sportspeople from Bend, Oregon
People from Redmond, Oregon
American football tight ends
American football outside linebackers
Oregon Ducks football players
San Francisco 49ers players
Miami Dolphins players
Philadelphia Eagles players
New England Patriots players
Jacksonville Jaguars players